Ignatius Ghattas (25 December 1920 — 11 October 1992) was a bishop of the Melkite Greek Catholic Church. He served as Eparch of Newton from 1990 until his death.

Bishop Ghattas was born in Nazareth in 1920 and raised in Maaloul.  He entered Holy Saviour monastery in Saida, Lebanon following his primary education and professed his religious vows in 1939. He was ordained a priest of the Basilian Salvatorian Order in 1946. Following his ordination he taught Greek, Latin, English, French and mathematics.

In 1952, he went to the United States to serve as assistant pastor of St. Elias parish in Cleveland, Ohio, and was appointed pastor in 1955. Later he was elected bishop by the Holy Synod of the Melkite Church in July 1989 and approved by the Holy See on December 11. He was consecrated bishop on February 23, 1990, succeeding Archbishop Joseph Tawil as eparch.

Bishop Ignatius Ghattas founded the Order of Saint Nicholas in 1991, a regional lay order attached to the Melkite Greek Catholic Eparchy of Newton.

He died in Cleveland, Ohio in 1992, aged 71.

See also
Melkite Greek Catholic Eparchy of Newton
Melkite Greek Catholic Church

References

1920 births
1992 deaths
People from Nazareth
American people of Palestinian descent
American Melkite Greek Catholic bishops
Mandatory Palestine emigrants to Lebanon
Lebanese emigrants to the United States
Religious leaders from Cleveland
Melkite Greek Catholic bishops
Founders of Eastern Catholic religious communities
People from Bethlehem
20th-century American clergy